Noboru Ito (31 January 1903 – 7 February 1993) was a Japanese composer. His work was part of the music event in the art competition at the 1936 Summer Olympics.

References

1903 births
1993 deaths
Japanese male composers
Olympic competitors in art competitions
People from Matsumoto, Nagano
20th-century Japanese male musicians